William Talbot (ca 1792 – April 28, 1873) was a farmer, fisher and politician in Newfoundland. He served in the Newfoundland House of Assembly.

Talbot spent 59 years in Newfoundland and owned a farm in Harbour Grace. He was elected to the assembly for Conception Bay in 1852 and then was elected for Harbour Main in 1855. Around 1859, he retired from politics due to failing eyesight.

His son Thomas Talbot also served in the Newfoundland assembly.

References 

Members of the Newfoundland and Labrador House of Assembly
1873 deaths
Year of birth uncertain
Newfoundland Colony people